This list includes SC Bastia players. Charles Orlanducci, with 429 matches, holds the record for most matches with the team. Claude Papi is the player with most goals, at 117 goals.

List of players

A

B

C

D

E

F

G

H

I

J

K

L

M

N

O

P

Q

R

S

T

U

V

W

X

Y

Z 

Note: Note: The players in bold, is now playing Bastia.

 
Bastia
Association football player non-biographical articles